Michal Schlegel (born 31 May 1995 in Ústí nad Orlicí) is a Czech cyclist, who currently rides for UCI ProTeam . He was named in the start list for the 2017 Giro d'Italia.

Major results

2013
 1st  Time trial, National Junior Road Championships
2014
 2nd Time trial, National Under-23 Road Championships
 4th Grand Prix Královéhradeckého kraje
2015
 1st  Young rider classification Troféu Joaquim Agostinho
 3rd Time trial, National Under-23 Road Championships
 3rd Overall East Bohemia Tour
1st  Young rider classification
 6th Overall Czech Cycling Tour
1st  Young rider classification
 7th Road race, UCI Under-23 Road World Championships
 10th Overall Giro della Valle d'Aosta
2016
 National Under-23 Road Championships
1st  Road race
1st  Time trial
 2nd Gran Premio Palio del Recioto
 8th Overall Tour de l'Avenir
 8th Overall Czech Cycling Tour
1st  Young rider classification
2017
 3rd Overall Grand Prix Priessnitz spa
 6th Overall Tour de l'Avenir
 7th Overall Tour of Croatia
1st  Young rider classification
 9th Overall Czech Cycling Tour
1st  Young rider classification
2018
 6th GP Hungary
2019
 2nd Overall Tour Alsace
1st Stage 3
 National Road Championships
4th Road race
4th Time trial
 6th Overall Istrian Spring Trophy
 6th Overall Sibiu Cycling Tour
 8th Overall Tour of Bihor
2021
 1st  Overall Tour of Małopolska
1st Stage 1
 1st GP Hungary
 3rd Overall Sibiu Cycling Tour
 3rd Overall Oberösterreich Rundfahrt
1st  Points classification
1st Stage 2 
 3rd GP Slovenia

Grand Tour general classification results timeline

References

External links

1995 births
Living people
Czech male cyclists
People from Ústí nad Orlicí
European Games competitors for the Czech Republic
Cyclists at the 2015 European Games
Sportspeople from the Pardubice Region